Rosie Fortna (born December 18, 1946) is a retired American alpine skier who competed in the 1968 Winter Olympics.

Awards 
2016 - Vermont Ski and Snowboard Museum Special Contributor

External links
 Rosie Fortna Olympic Profile

References

1946 births
Living people
American female alpine skiers
Olympic alpine skiers of the United States
Alpine skiers at the 1968 Winter Olympics
Sportspeople from Vermont
21st-century American women